The Central African Republic competed in the Olympic Games for the first time at the 1968 Summer Olympics in Mexico City, Mexico.

Athletics

Men's 5000m 
Gabriel Mboa - 13rd Place(17:33:1)

References
Official Olympic Reports

Nations at the 1968 Summer Olympics
1968
1968 in the Central African Republic